The following highways are numbered 844:

India
 National Highway 844 (India)

United States